Paige Powell (born 1950 or 1951) is an American photographer, curator, art consultant, and animal rights activist. Powell was the public affairs director of the Portland Zoo before she moved to New York City in 1980. Between 1982 and 1994, she worked at Interview magazine. She started out selling advertising and eventually became the associate publisher. As Andy Warhol's close friend and confidante, she became immersed in the 1980s New York City art scene. Since returning to her native Portland in 1994, she has split her time between working on art projects and supporting animal charities.

Life and career 

Powell was raised Southwest Portland, Oregon, the daughter of the founding partner of a successful insurance agency. Powell volunteered at Portland Zoo teaching chimpanzees sign language and playing with them as part of the chimpanzee enrichment program before she became the public affairs director at the zoo. She studied art in Greece before working at Blue Ribbon Sports.  

Powell moved to New York City in December 1980. She wanted to work for either film director Woody Allen in a production role or pop artist Andy Warhol at Interview magazine. "I approached both, and was offered two jobs, but it just so happened that the one at Interview, selling advertising, started first," she said. In 1982, Powell began working at Interview and was eventually promoted to the position of associate publisher. She became a regular at Warhol's Factory whilst also working part-time as a freelance photojournalist for the Japanese magazine Brutus.  

In April 1983, Powell held an exhibition with Jean-Michel Basquiat as the main artist. "I had some friends who had an apartment in New York but they were living in Geneva, so there was basically no furniture, and I asked if I could do a show in the apartment. My boyfriend at the time was one of Andy’s technical assistants and he thought I should really get Jean-Michel [for the exhibition]," she recalled. Graffiti artists Rammellzee, A-One, Lady Pink, Kool Koor, and Toxic were also included in the show. Powell sold some of Basquiat's paintings and eventually they began dating. Through their relationship, Basquiat and Warhol became close friends. In August 1983, Basquiat moved into a loft that Warhol owned on Great Jones Street in NoHo and soon they began collaborating.  

Although Powell and Basquiat ended their romantic relationship in 1984, she remained close friends with Warhol until his death in February 1987. "We were attached like mittens.... we lived eight blocks from one another, we worked together and partied together. We ate the same macrobiotic food, had the same Japanese masseuse, used the same Olympus camera and even had the same haircut for a while." They had discussed adopting a child together, and Warhol wanted to work with her directly on commissioned projects. At Warhol's burial, Powell placed a copy of Interview and a bottle of Beautiful Eau de Parfum by Estée Lauder into his grave before it was covered with earth. 

Powell was an early adopter of camcorder technology and often filmed her friends. She forged friendships with creatives such as artist Francesco Clemente, novelist Tama Janowitz, and fashion designer Stephen Sprouse among others. While working at Interview, Powell and Janowitz developed a Manhattan public-access television program called It’s a Dog's Life, profiling adoptable animals in half-hour segments. 

Following her return to Portland in 1994, Powell has split her time between working for non-profit animal-protection organizations and as a curator and art consultant. In 1999, Powell founded the Pearl Arts Foundation with developer Homer Williams, becoming its executive director. The Pearl Arts Foundation was dissolved in 2003.  

In 2001, Powell and her friend Kim Singer were sued by John Lindberg over the kidnapping of a boxer named Shaq which they believed was being neglected. After they took the dog, he developed an intestinal ailment and was euthanized when no one volunteered to pay for an operation. Powell was unaware of the euthanizing until afterward. 

Powell curated the art collection for The Nines hotel in Portland. Her clients also include The Lexington Hotel NYC, The Baronette Renaissance Detroit-Novi Hotel, JW Marriott Denver Cheery Creek, and the Renaissance Pittsburgh Hotel. 

Powell was instrumental in mounting a retrospective exhibition of the work of Stephen Sprouse at Deitch Projects in 2009, via her friend curator Jeffrey Deitch. 

Powell documented the rising careers of her friends, musician Thomas Lauderdale of Pink Martini and filmmaker Gus Van Sant. Lauderdale encouraged Powell to go through her archive of 1980s photographs and to start showing them to the public. In 2014, she had her first exhibition, Jean-Michel Basquiat, Reclining Nude, at the Suzanne Geiss Gallery in New York. Basquiat's estate opposed publishing the intimate photos, which depict Basquiat nude.

In 2019, Powell collaborated with Gucci for a series of installations of her photographs called Beulah Land, which was named after the bar in Manhattan where Powell covered the walls in photos of her "non-biological family." It was first displayed at Gucci on Wooster Street in New York and then Dover Street Market in Ginza, Tokyo, and London. Coinciding with the installation, a three-book set was published celebrating Powell's images of culture, art, and nightlife in 1980s New York.

Claire Forlani as Gina Cardinale in the Julian Schnabel film Basquiat (1996) is a composite character of Basquiat's girlfriends, including Powell. Powell appeared in the documentary film Basquiat: Rage to Riches (2017) and in the Netflix docuseries The Andy Warhol Diaries (2022).

Exhibitions 

 Jean-Michel Basquiat, Reclining Nude at Suzanne Geiss Company in New York, Jan 16, 2014–Feb 22, 2014.
 Paige Powell: The Ride at Portland Art Museum in Portland, Nov 5, 2015–April 3, 2016.
 (Self) at Douglas F. Cooley Memorial Art Gallery in Portland, August 29, 2017–October 1, 2017.
 Beulah Land at Gucci Wooster in New York, April 17, 2019–May, 17 2019.
 Beulah Land  at Dover Street Market in Tokyo, September 7, 2019–September 26, 2019.
 Beulah Land London at Dover Street Market in London, November 6, 2019–November 21, 2019.

References

External links 

 
 

Artists from Portland, Oregon
American women photographers
Women photojournalists
American art curators
American consultants
American animal rights activists
American women curators
1950s births
Living people